Sjonni's Friends were an Icelandic tribute band also known at times as Sigurjón's Friends. The band formed in early 2011 when the Icelandic singer Sjonni Brink (real name Sigurjón Brink) died just days before he was to perform his entry "Aftur heim" at Söngvakeppni Sjónvarpsins, the Icelandic national final for the Eurovision Song Contest 2011.

Söngvakeppni Sjónvarpsins 2011
On 12 February 2011, the group won the Icelandic national selection; Söngvakeppni Sjónvarpsins 2011 with the song "Aftur heim". The original artist was meant to be Sigurjón Brink himself, however on 17 January 2011 before he was set to compete in the third semi-final, Sigurjón unexpectedly died, due to natural causes, at his home in Garðabær. Sigurjón's family decided, on reflection that they would like for the song to remain in the competition, and that it should be performed by a tribute band, formed after his death, consisting of Sigurjón's real life musician friends.

The group made it past the first semi-final into the final, where the group won the right to represent Iceland in the Eurovision Song Contest 2011.

Band member Gunnar Ólason had previously represented Iceland in the Eurovision Song Contest 2001 as part of the band Two Tricky.

Eurovision Song Contest 2011
The actual Eurovision competition was held in Düsseldorf, Germany in May 2011 where the formation Sjonni's Friends sang "Coming Home", an English version of "Aftur heim".

The first semi-final took place in Esprit Arena in Düsseldorf on 10 May 2011. Nineteen country entries, including Iceland, took part. Sjonni's Friends performed fourteenth, finishing 4th (6th at the televoting and 3rd with the jury vote). They moved to the finals of the competition that were held on 14 May 2011 with 25 finalists taking part. They were the 21st entry to perform. They came 20th overall with 61 points.

Members
Members of the band were:
Gunnar Ólason
Vignir Snær Vigfússon
Pálmi Sigurhjartarson
Matthías Matthíasson
Hreimur Örn Heimisson
Benedikt Brynleifsson

Some have continued with solo singing careers. Vignir Snær Vigfússon came back in 2014 to take part in Söngvakeppnin 2014, the qualification rounds for selecting Icelandic song for the 2014 Eurovision Song Contest with the song "Elsku þú", but failed to win. Matthías Matthíasson also returned in Söngvakeppnin 2020 with the song "Dreyma", but also failed to win.

Discography
Sjonni's Friends
2011: "Aftur heim" retitled "Coming Home"

Member releases
2014: Vignir Snær Vigfússon - "Elsku þú"

References

Icelandic pop music groups
Eurovision Song Contest entrants of 2011
Eurovision Song Contest entrants for Iceland
Tribute bands